The tenth and final season of Law & Order: Criminal Intent premiered Sunday, May 1, 2011, on USA Network. The timeslot was moved to Sunday nights at 9 p.m. (ET) from Tuesday nights at 10:00 pm Eastern/9:00 pm Central.

This marks the first and only season since the show's debut that did not air with the original Law & Order still on the air, due to the latter's cancellation by NBC in May 2010. Episodes from this season repeated on NBC on Mondays starting May 30, 2011, at 9 p.m. (ET), leading into new episodes of Law & Order: LA, which was placed on hiatus from January to early April 2011, causing its own new episodes to air through July 2011.

Law & Order: Criminal Intent finished its ten season run on June 26, 2011. It was confirmed by USA Network co-president Jeff Wachtel on July 15, 2011; when asked about a possible 11th season Wachtel answered "No—and this is said with respect for the show, respect for Dick [Wolf], and most significantly with respect to the audience." Wachtel also cited reasons for not renewing being monetary issues. The episodes in the tenth season averaged 4.43 million total viewers and 1.67 million in the age 18-49 demographic; higher than the numbers the show pulled in the ninth season.

Cast and crew changes and returning characters
In August 2010, Jeff Goldblum (Detective Zack Nichols) announced his departure from the series after switching agencies and being unsure of the series's future. The options for renewal of Goldblum, Saffron Burrows, and Mary Elizabeth Mastrantonio's contracts formally expired on July 31, 2010, after being extended by a month on June 30 when they were originally up. The series at the time was in limbo. Over a month later, it was confirmed that Criminal Intent was returning for a tenth and final season consisting of eight episodes, with star Vincent D'Onofrio who portrays Detective Robert Goren. The news of Law & Order: CI getting a proper closure was in stark contrast with the abrupt cancellation of the original mothership series by NBC in May 2010.

Weeks later, it was announced that Kathryn Erbe would be returning as her character Detective Alex Eames, also confirming that ninth season cast member Saffron Burrows (Detective Serena Stevens) had departed. This meant a return to the single, original pair of Detectives Eames and Goren that featured in the first four seasons of the series.

In February 2011, Jay O. Sanders joined the cast as Captain Joseph Hannah, replacing Mary Elizabeth Mastrantonio (Captain Zoe Callas). Sanders has appeared in episodes of both the original Law & Order and L&O: Criminal Intent (in the second season episode Dead).

Chris Brancato replaced Walon Green as show runner/executive producer. Green was show runner/EP throughout seasons 8 and 9. Former show runner/executive producer Warren Leight wrote the episode "Trophy Wine", along with all the scenes with D'Onofrio and Julia Ormond, and the final scenes in the finale, "To the Boy In the Blue Knit Cap". Co-creator, developer, and former show runner/EP René Balcer re-wrote the finale as well, but went uncredited. Brancato suggested that the show could be picked up for an 11th season if the intended final episodes garner sufficient ratings.

Returning star Vincent D'Onofrio felt; "The fact that we had so many viewers, more than other cable shows, it's odd to see the show end." Although the show suffered a sharp ratings decline in the ninth season; coinciding with D'Onofrio and Erbe being written out of the show. Kathryn Erbe said to TV Guide if Law & Order: CI was possibly renewed; "I know that I would be there in a heartbeat. I'm fairly positive that Vincent [D'Onofrio] feels the same way. Everyone was really hoping that, in the 11th hour, we'd get some word. Whether the fans are able to muscle us back or not, who knows. They have amazing power."

Season overview
Season ten returns to the single pairing of Detectives Robert Goren (Vincent D'Onofrio) and Alexandra Eames (Kathryn Erbe) at the Major Case Squad. Terminated for insubordination a year ago, Detective Goren has been reunited with his long-time partner Alex Eames at the behest of the new Major Case Captain (Jay O. Sanders). However, in addition to solving cases, Goren has mandatory sessions with brilliant police psychologist Dr. Paula Gyson (Julia Ormond).

This final eight episode arc focussed on Goren's tortured past and charting a course for a successful future. Storylines for this season included a beautiful female banker whose sole client was the Catholic Church; an adventuresome rogue who may be the country's best cyber-warrior; and a woman who was blackmailing a wealthy, tabloid-fodder "bad boy." The episode "Icarus" explored a scenario inspired by many of the cast incidents in the Broadway play Spider-Man: Turn Off the Dark; in this case, they turn tragic. This version features characters ranging from a high-strung director to a secretly bisexual rock-star composer.

Cast

Regular cast
 Vincent D'Onofrio as Detective Robert Goren
 Kathryn Erbe as Detective Alexandra Eames

Also starring
 Jay O. Sanders as Captain Joseph Hannah
 Julia Ormond as Dr. Paula Gyson

Recurring cast
 Leslie Hendrix as Chief Medical Examiner Elizabeth Rodgers

Guest stars
Appearing in the episode, titled "Rispetto" (aired May 1, 2011), Jay Mohr guest-starred as a famous and incredibly successful Charlie Sheen-type bad boy. Mohr’s character, Nyle Brite, hails from a different area of the arts: He is a "rock star" fashion designer whose every creation turns to gold. And his reputation for cocaine benders and call girl-populated parties only skyrockets his career and mints him as the "lovable rogue." The plot of the episode includes the murder of a guest at one of Brite’s parties. Noelle Beck also guest starred in the episode as Debra, Nyle’s long-suffering but brilliant wife who has managed to withstand 20 years of his antics because she has secrets of her own.

Neal McDonough guest starred in an episode titled "The Consoler" (aired May 8, 2011), playing a Monsignor who does very good things for the Church (starting soup kitchens, orphanages, cancer wards, etc.,) but also has a scandalous secret. Guest starring in "Boots on the Ground" (aired May 15, 2011) is Jeri Ryan as Naomi Halloran, a former CIA official who has started a private security company worth hundreds of millions. This no-nonsense businesswoman also is harboring a secret.

Julie White guest starred as New York City’s premiere marriage broker, one who fetches $700,000 for her services in the episode "The Last Street in Manhattan". Andrea Roth also guest starred during the season in the episode "Trophy Wine", in a case where a wine importer is found dead of a heart attack after being locked in his wine cellar. Steven Weber guest starred in episode six titled "Cadaver". Camille Chen and Rosalind Chao also guest starred alongside Weber.

Cynthia Nixon played Amanda Rollins (no relation to the Law & Order: Special Victims Unit character of the same name), the high-strung and larger-than-life director behind a problem-plagued Broadway version of Icarus. After a sabotaged stunt results in the death of an actor on stage, Amanda spirals out of control. Michael Panes, Christopher McDonald, and Eion Bailey also guest starred with Nixon. Raymond J. Barry played Detective Eames' father when she and Goren had a case that lead them to her childhood home in Inwood.

Adrian Pasdar and Bryan Batt guest-starred in an episode titled "Trophy Wine". Pasdar played a wine collector named Mason Kent and Batt portrayed a premiere wine sommelier also known as "The Nose". Both come under suspicion when a high-end wine connoisseur — who has been counterfeiting the product — dies of a heart attack while locked in his cellar.

In the final episode, "To the Boy in the Blue Knit Cap", James Van Der Beek played Rex Tamlyn, an overconfident, hard-partying playboy and partner in a Facebook-like website devoted to "connecting people who share fleeting romantic encounters." The pulled-from-the-headlines aspect of the episode involves a lawsuit surrounding a stolen idea. Also appearing in the episode were Thad Luckinbill and his identical twin Trent playing the "Winklevoss-ian" defendants.  NFL Running Back Brandon Jacobs also make a special guest appearance as bouncer. And Tovah Feldshuh reprised her role of attorney Danielle Melnick from Law & Order.

Rock and Roll Hall of Famer and award-winning author Patti Smith guest starred in the episode "Icarus" as an old friend of Detective Goren (D'Onofrio), Columbia University mythology professor Cleo Alexander, to help figure out the meaning behind "Icarus" (a metaphor for failed ambition). Smith had to say about D'Onofrio, "He's been taught by the greatest, and he taught me, so I feel like if I had to do it again, I'd be really good," she says. "He's such a great actor, such a great director and becoming such a good friend."

Episodes

{| class="wikitable plainrowheaders" style="width:99%"
|- style="color:white"
! style="background:#1f3559;"|No. inseries
! style="background:#1f3559;"|No. inseason
! style="background:#1f3559;"|Title
! style="background:#1f3559;"|Directed by
! style="background:#1f3559;"|Written by
! style="background:#1f3559; width:100px"| air date
! style="background:#1f3559; width:120px"|NBC air date
! style="background:#1f3559;"|
! style="background:#1f3559;"|U.S. viewers(millions)

|}

References

External links

10
2011 American television seasons